Sportsman's Guide is an online retailer of hunting and fishing gear, military surplus, ammunition and outdoor sporting goods. It is based in South St. Paul, Minnesota, USA. The company was founded by Gary Olen in 1970, and the first Sportsman's Guide catalogue was mailed in 1976. In 2012, Sportsman's Guide employed about 700 people.

History 
Sportsman's Guide was founded by Gary Olen, getting its start in his basement in the winter of 1970. The first product, a patch for hunting jackets detailing the previous year's trophy success, immediately proved popular with hunters across the country.

The first Sportsman's Guide catalog was just one page, and it was delivered at the time of the opening of the hunting season in 1977. By 1992, The Guide was mailing eight outdoor gear and clothing catalogs annually, and by 2012, the number had risen to 63. 

Sportsman's Guide has, over time, expanded its range to include ammunition, shooting supplies and accessories, clothing and footwear, camping gear, items for home, garden and patio, electronics, optics, gifts, sports and recreation, and truck and ATV items.

In 2006, Sportsman's Guide was acquired for approximately $265 million by Redcats USA, a wholly owned subsidiary of Redcats Group which is the home-shopping group owned by French luxury and distribution group PPR (Pinault-Printemps-Redoute).

In 2012, Sportsman's Guide was acquired for $215 million by Northern Tool + Equipment.

Sportsman's Guide headquarters is located in South St. Paul, Minnesota. The Sportsman's Guide catalog website, and retail store all operate from the 330,000-square-foot building located on Farwell Avenue.

Private Label Brands 
Sportsman's Guide also has several private label brands made up of items designed and sourced by company team members: Bolderton, Guide Gear, HuntRite, Castlecreek, and HQ ISSUE.

Buyer’s Club 
Sportsman's Guide Buyer's Club Advantage Catalog was introduced in January 1995. Members pay an annual fee to receive various discounts and other benefits.

References

Online retailers of the United States
Privately held companies based in Minnesota
Companies based in Minnesota
Retail companies established in 1970
1970 establishments in Minnesota